Ambrosius Beber (fl. 1610–1620) was a German composer. Very little is known about his life. He lived and worked in the first part of the 17th century. He is mentioned as a "musician of Naumburg". 

The only work that survives is a St. Mark Passion from about 1610.

See also
heterographs Bieber and Biber

References

External links

German classical composers
German Baroque composers
German male classical composers
17th-century German people
Year of birth unknown
Year of death unknown
People from Naumburg (Saale)